Kristen Henderson (or Kristen Ellis-Henderson) is a founding member, guitarist and songwriter for the all female popular rock band Antigone Rising. She is also the author of a memoir, "Times Two, Two Women in Love and The Happy Family They Made" (Free Press/Simon & Schuster)., and maintains a blog, "Hangin' with Hendo" where she voices opinions simply by telling her own personal stories on politically charged issues like same sex adoption and marriage equality. She and wife, Sarah Kate Ellis-Henderson, are vocal advocates on LGBT issues, especially marriage and family equality. In 2013, Kristen made the Buzzfeed's Most Powerful LGBT Icons and Allies List alongside The Pope, Madonna, President Obama, Edie Windsor and Elton John.

Personal life

Kristen grew up on Long Island in Glen Cove, NY. After graduating from Glen Cove High School she attended Bucknell University obtaining BA degrees in Psychology and Education.  While at Bucknell, she formed an all female band called Mistress with sister, Cathy and lead singer, Penelope "Peppy" Kokines. After graduation the three moved to New York City where they formed Antigone Rising.
 
Kristen married Sarah Kate Ellis on October 22, 2011. Their wedding was the first performed in the Episcopal Church of New York after marriage equality passed in the state senate in June, 2011. Kristen and Sarah were featured in a special New York Times Style section  devoted to Marriage Equality on the day it became legal in New York State (July 24, 2011). The Huffington Post also did a 3 part feature web series titled "Here Come The Brides", documenting the couple's wedding, from dress shopping to their eventual "I Do's."

Kristen and Sarah Kate (President & CEO of GLAAD - Gay & Lesbian Alliance Against Defamation), got pregnant on exactly the same day in May, 2008, and gave birth in February 2009; Kristen to their son, Thomas and Sarah Kate to their daughter, Kate Spencer.  They wrote a memoir about the experience titled "Times Two, Two Women in Love and The Happy Family They Made" which came out on April 4, 2011, through Free Press, an imprint of Simon & Schuster.

Antigone Rising

The band's first show was at Cafe Figaro on Bleecker St. in New York City's Greenwich Village. In 1998 Antigone Rising won a Levi's contest and played several of Sara Mclachlan's New York area Lilith Fair dates, one in New York City's Bryant Park on June 1 in front of 10,000 people. From 2000 to 2008 the band spent most of its time touring the country and building a massive grassroots following playing up to 280 shows a year. In 2003, Antigone Rising signed a major label record deal with Jason Flom at Lava Records/Atlantic Records and on May 11, 2005, their major label debut From the Ground Up was released in conjunction with Starbucks Hear Music label.  The first single, "Don't Look Back," was co-written with Rob Thomas from Matchbox Twenty.  Howard Schultz, CEO of Starbucks introduced the ladies as a "band our entire company is very proud to call one of our own," before a performance at a Starbucks plant in York, PA in 2010 and has continued to play Antigone Rising's music in Starbucks locations around the country. The band has toured with The Rolling Stones, Aerosmith, The Allman Brothers, Rob Thomas, The Bangles, Dave Matthews Band, Joan Jett and the Blackhearts.

In 2012, the United States Government invited Antigone Rising to travel to Israel and The West Bank/Palestine to act as cultural ambassadors. The band toured the region extensively performing in remote villages and schools during the day as part of an outreach program, and doing large concerts at night in nightclubs and theaters.

The band is currently signed to the distribution division of Joan Jett's Blackheart Records label where they released a full-length CD in 2011 titled "23 Red." Funded entirely by fans through a Kickstarter campaign, the band raised close to $40K to complete their project.

The band's breakaway 2013 single, "That Was The Whiskey"  is available on iTunes and was released on March 19, 2013. Kristen co-wrote the single with lead singer, Nini Camps, and successful Nashville songwriter, Lori McKenna, who has penned hits for Faith Hill and Little Big Town. The video for the single, directed by fellow Bucknellian Mikki DelMonico, was in heavy rotation on CMT and CMT.com.

References

External links
Hangin' With Hendo
Band's Official website
Interview with Kristen
Huffington Post Blog, The Dress
Huffington Post Video Documentary Here Come The Brides
Most Power Quotes From LGBT Icons 2013 - Kristen Ellis-Henderson

American women singer-songwriters
American women guitarists
Living people
People from Glen Cove, New York
People from Long Island
Bucknell University alumni
American lesbian musicians
LGBT people from New York (state)
American LGBT singers
American LGBT songwriters
21st-century American memoirists
American lesbian writers
21st-century American women writers
American LGBT rights activists
American women memoirists
American country bass guitarists
American rock bass guitarists
Women bass guitarists
Lesbian singers
Lesbian songwriters
Lesbian memoirists
Singer-songwriters from New York (state)
Activists from New York (state)
Guitarists from New York (state)
Country musicians from New York (state)
Year of birth missing (living people)
21st-century American LGBT people